The Schwalmere is a mountain of the Bernese Alps, located between Kiental and Lauterbrunnen in the Bernese Oberland. It lies on the range north of the Schilthorn.

References

External links
 Schwalmere on Hikr

Mountains of the Alps
Mountains of Switzerland
Mountains of the canton of Bern
Two-thousanders of Switzerland